This is an incomplete list of University of Canberra people, including notable alumni and staff.

Alumni

Science 

 Yolarnie Amepou, herpetologist and conservationist

Law 
 Shane Drumgold SC, lawyer and Director of Public Prosecutions (ACT)
Kristy McBain, member of the house of representatives, former mayor of Bega Valley Shire Council
Andrew Bass, lawyer and media law expert
Dr Bruce Baer Arnold, legal academic and Privacy/IP law expert

Business 
 Betty Kitchener, founder of mental health first aid training and CEO of Mental Health First Aid International
 Deborah Schofield, director of the Centre for Economic Impacts of Genomic Medicine, Macquarie University
 Vivek Wadhwa, technology entrepreneur and academic

Government 
 Simon Corbell, Labor member of the Australian Capital Territory Legislative Assembly and former Attorney-General and senior Minister
 Kelly Hoare, member of the Australian House of Representatives
 Virginia Judge, Member for Strathfield and NSW Minister for Fair Trading, Citizenship and Minister Assisting The Premier on the Arts
 Ben Small, Liberal Senator for Western Australia
 Ursula Stephens, Parliamentary Secretary for Social Inclusion and the Voluntary Sector
Dr Lotay Tshering, 2018–present Prime Minister of Bhutan
Steve Whan, Member for Monaro and NSW Minister for Emergency Services Minister for Primary Industries and Minister for Rural Affairs

Humanities 
 Matt Worley, HIV Scientist
 Wil Anderson, comedian
 Adam Boland, producer Sunrise, Weekend Sunrise and The Morning Show - Channel Seven.
 Genesis Owusu, singer and four-time ARIA Music Awards winner
 Justin Heazlewood, aka The Bedroom Philosopher, comedian/folk singer
 Cate Kennedy, author
 Garth Nix, author
 Jonathan Uptin, weekend presenter of Nine News Queensland
 David Vernon, writer
 JG Montgomery, author

Sport 
 Ben Alexander, Australian rugby union player, former Captain of The University of Canberra Brumbies
 Maitlan Brown, Australia, Melbourne Renegades and NSW Breakers cricketer
 Nathan Deakes, Olympic athlete and medallist, World Champion and World Record Holder in the 50 km Walk
 Scott Fava, Western Force rugby union player
 George Gregan, former captain, Australian national rugby union team
 Lee Lai Shan, Olympics Gold Medalist in Windsurfing
 Petria Thomas, Olympic swimmer and multiple gold medal winner
 Alan Tongue, Canberra Raiders rugby league player

Pageantry 
 Hannah Arnold, beauty pageant titleholder crowned Binibining Pilipinas International 2021

Administration

Chancellors

Vice-Chancellors

References

University of Canberra people